Wild and Peaceful may refer to:

 Wild and Peaceful (Kool & the Gang album) (1973)
 Wild and Peaceful (Teena Marie album) (1979)
 "Wild & Peaceful", a song by Incognito